Julio Mannino is a Mexican actor, born in Toluca, Mexico.

He appeared on La fea más bella in 2006 as a supporting actor.

Career

Reality shows
 Mi sueño es bailar (2012)  (Concursante)

Telenovela
Sueño de amor (2016) - Mario Kuri
 Que te perdone Dios (2015) – Benito
 Cuando me enamoro (2010)  (Participación Especial)
 La fea más bella (2006) – Simón "Simon" Joseph Contreras
 Apuesta por un amor (2004) – Leandro Pedraza
 Niña amada mía (2003) – Pablo Guzman
 Por un beso (2000–2001) – Neto
 ¡Amigos x siempre! (2000) – Marco
 Cuento de Navidad (1999–2000) 
 El niño que vino del mar (1999) – Dr. Juan Manuel Ríos
 Rencor apasionado (1998) – Efraín
 Camila (1998) – Nacho Juárez
 Sin ti (1997–1998)
 Salud, dinero y amor (1997)
 Mi querida Isabel (1996)
 Para toda la vida (1996)
 Luz Clarita(1996)
 María la del barrio (1995)
 Acapulco, cuerpo y alma (1995)

External links
 
 http://www.alma-latina.net/01actors/j/julio_mannino.shtml/ Julio Mannino at www.alma-Latina.net

Living people
Mexican male telenovela actors
Mexican people of Italian descent
People from Toluca
Year of birth missing (living people)